Events from the year 1865 in Scotland.

Incumbents

Law officers 
 Lord Advocate – James Moncreiff
 Solicitor General for Scotland – George Young

Judiciary 
 Lord President of the Court of Session and Lord Justice General – Lord Colonsay
 Lord Justice Clerk – Lord Glenalmond

Events 
 16 January – new fishing harbour at St Monans completed.
 3 March – Thomas Sutherland founds the Hong Kong and Shanghai Banking Corporation.
 28 July – English general practitioner Edward William Pritchard becomes the last person publicly hanged in Glasgow (on Glasgow Green), for poisoning his wife and mother-in-law in the city.
 6 October – the iron cargo/passenger steamer Agamemnon is launched by Scotts Shipbuilding and Engineering Company at Greenock. Equipped with an efficient compound steam engine, she pioneers trade by steam to the Far East.
 30–31 December – 24 vessels are wrecked around the Dubh Artach reef in a storm.
 165 emigrants leave the island of Raasay for Australia.
 Joseph Lister begins to experiment with antiseptic surgery in Glasgow using carbolic acid.
 Fourth cholera pandemic reaches Scotland.
 James Clerk Maxwell (who this year moves back to the family home at Glenlair House) publishes A Dynamical Theory of the Electromagnetic Field.
 Amhuinnsuidhe Castle on Harris is built for Charles Murray, 7th Earl of Dunmore by David Bryce.

Births 
 28 March – Mary Findlater, novelist (died 1963)
 27 April – Archibald Leitch, architect, most famous for his work designing stadia throughout the British Isles (died 1939)
 28 June – David Young Cameron, painter (died 1945)
 17 October – Dugald Cowan, educationalist and Liberal politician (died 1933)
 6 November – William Boog Leishman, military physician (died 1926)
 William Gillies, nationalist (died 1932)

Deaths 
 18 January – James Beaumont Neilson, ironmaster (born 1792)
 5 June – John Richardson, Royal Navy surgeon, naturalist and arctic explorer (born 1787)
 4 August – William Edmondstoune Aytoun, poet, humorist and lawyer (born 1813)
 19 October – Robert Crichton Wyllie, physician, businessman and Minister of Foreign Affairs in the Kingdom of Hawaii (born 1798)
 23 December – Alan Stevenson, lighthouse designer (born 1807)

The arts
 Thomas Faed's painting The Last of the Clan is first exhibited
 Gaelic poet William Livingston (Uilleam Macdhunleibhe)'s collection Duain agus Orain is published in Glasgow
 George MacDonald's novel Alec Forbes of Howglen is published

See also 
 Timeline of Scottish history
 1865 in the United Kingdom

References 

 
Years of the 19th century in Scotland
Scotland
1860s in Scotland